Bird-in-Hand Hotel, also known as the Bird-In-Hand Village Inn & Suites or the Rhoad's Hotel, is a historic hotel located at Bird-in-Hand, East Lampeter Township, Lancaster County, Pennsylvania. It was built in 1852, on the site of several earlier wayside taverns.  It has a three-story, rectangular brick main block with a 2 1/2-story, rear "T"-wing and a 2-story extension. It features a full-width front porch with Tuscan order columns and a symmetrical facade in a vernacular Greek Revival style. It was renovated in 1989.

It was listed on the National Register of Historic Places in 1992.

References

External links
Bird-in-Hand Village Inn & Suites website

Hotel buildings on the National Register of Historic Places in Pennsylvania
Greek Revival architecture in Pennsylvania
Hotel buildings completed in 1852
Buildings and structures in Lancaster County, Pennsylvania
1852 establishments in Pennsylvania
National Register of Historic Places in Lancaster County, Pennsylvania
Hotels established in 1852